Camille Liénard (2 July 1934 – 24 March 2021) was a Belgian bobsledder. He competed in the four-man event at the 1964 Winter Olympics.

References

External links
 

1934 births
2021 deaths
Belgian male bobsledders
Olympic bobsledders of Belgium
Bobsledders at the 1964 Winter Olympics
People from Schaerbeek
Sportspeople from Brussels